Christopher John Wiggins (January 13, 1931 – February 19, 2017) was an English-born Canadian actor.

Career
He started out as a banker in his home country before he began his acting career in Canada, where he moved in 1952.

Wiggins is probably best recognized for his role as Jack Marshak, the benevolent, resourceful expert on the occult in the syndicated television horror show Friday the 13th: The Series, and which ran from 1987 to 1990. Another well known role was Johann Robinson (Father) on Swiss Family Robinson.

He won a Canadian Film Award in 1969 for Genie Award for Best Actor (Non-Feature) for his role in The Best Damn Fiddler from Calabogie to Kaladar.

In addition to his television and film work, Wiggins was also a very popular radio actor, making over 1,200 appearances in various series over the years, particularly on CBC Radio. One of his most popular roles was that of Dante, the insufferably brilliant (and insufferably arrogant) computer that ran the Aleph-9: the high-speed interdimensional spacecraft belonging to Johnny Chase: Secret Agent of Space. Wiggins' also made numerous guest appearances on such CBC Radio programs as CBC Playhouse, Nightfall, Vanishing Point and dozens of others.

Wiggins also lent his voice to many animated TV series and movies. He was the voice of Thor and his human host Dr. Donald Blake from Marvel Comics in the 1966 The Marvel Super Heroes TV series, the voice of the villain Mysterio in the 1960s animated cartoon Spider-Man, the voice of Will Scarlet on Rocket Robin Hood, the Great Wishing Star in 1986's Care Bears Movie II: A New Generation, and the Care Bears' head villain, No Heart, on the Nelvana version of their TV show. He also voiced the character Dimetro in the 1980s cartoon Dinosaucers. His other roles in animated series and films included ALF Tales, Star Wars: Droids, Rock & Rule, Star Wars: Ewoks, Babar, Babar and the Adventures of Badou, Rupert, Richard Scarry, Franklin, and Redwall.

Death
Wiggins died at a nursing home in Elora, Ontario, on February 19, 2017, from complications from Alzheimer's disease. His wife, Sandra Crysler-Wiggins, predeceased him, and he had no children.

Selected filmography

General Motors Presents (1954-1961, TV Series) .... Jonah Grundeen / Sweeney / George / Sgt Wyeth / Second booking agent
Hawkeye and the Last of the Mohicans (1957, TV Series) .... Mort Bailey / Major Conn / Major Duffy / Mr. Travers / Sheriff Peterson / Jess Adams
The Unforeseen (1958-1959, TV Series) .... King / Monfort
R.C.M.P. (1959-1960, TV Series) .... George Needham / Kurt Hummel / Bush Pilot Watt / Martinson
Playdate (1961-1964, TV Series) .... Heinrich / Grandpa / Vanderkemp / Dr. Bahn
The United States Steel Hour (1961, TV Series) .... Charles Blake
William Lyon Mackenzie: A Friend to His Country (1961, Short) .... Jeweller?
Vacation Time (1962, TV Series) .... Co-host (1964)
The Forest Rangers (1963-1966, TV Series) .... Prof. Mandell / Porter
Moment of Truth (1964, TV Series) .... Dexter
Captain America (1966) .... Thor (Dr. Donald Blake) (voice)
Mighty Thor (1966, TV Series) .... Thor / Don Blake / Balder (voice)
The Marvel Super Heroes (1966-1969) .... (voice)
Julius Caesar (1966, TV Movie) .... Cassius
Once Upon a Prime Time (1966, Short)
Hatch's Mill (1967, TV Series) .... Donegan
Rocket Robin Hood (1967-1968, TV Series) .... Will Scarlet / Infinata / Baron Blank
Spiderman (1967-1970, TV Series) .... Mysterio / Harley Clivendon / Infinata (voice)
Wojeck (1968) .... Gilbert
The Best Damn Fiddler from Calabogie to Kaladar (1969) .... Emery
Adventures in Rainbow Country (1969, TV Series) .... Fred Vincent
King of the Grizzlies (1970) .... The Colonel
Paul Bernard, Psychiatrist (1971, TV Series) .... Dr. Paul Bernard
Follow the North Star (1972, TV Series) .... Dudley
Tom Sawyer (1973, TV Movie) .... Lawyer
The Neptune Factor (1973) .... Capt. Williams
The National Dream: Building the Impossible Railway (1974, TV Mini-Series documentary) .... Donald Smith
Swiss Family Robinson (1974-1976, TV Series) .... Johann Robinson / Buckley
Welcome to Blood City (1977) .... Gellor
Why Shoot the Teacher? (1977) .... Lyle Bishop
A Cosmic Christmas (1977, TV Short) .... Mayor (voice)
High-Ballin' (1978) .... King Caroll
Two Solitudes (1978) .... Capitain Yardley
Voice of the Fugitive (1978, Short) .... Silas
The Devil and Daniel Mouse (1978, TV Movie) .... B.L. Zebub / The Devil (voice)
Johnny Chase: Secret Agent of Space (1978-1981, TV Series)
Murder by Decree (1979) .... Doctor Hardy
Jigsaw (1979) .... MacKenzie
Riel (1979, TV Movie) .... Middleton
Fish Hawk (1979) .... Marcus Boggs
Intergalactic Thanksgiving (1979, TV Short) .... Pa Spademinder (voice)
An American Christmas Carol (1979, TV Movie) .... Mr. Nathaniel Brewster
The Littlest Hobo (1979-1981, TV Series) .... Ed Thompson / Grandpa
The Courage of Kavik, the Wolf Dog (1980, TV Movie) .... Dr. Vic Walker
Easter Fever (1980, TV Movie) .... Santa Claus / Baker (voice)
Virus (1980) .... Dr. Borodinov
Escape from Iran: The Canadian Caper (1981, TV Movie) .... John Sheardown
Titans (1981, TV Series) .... Galieo
Billy Goat's Bluff (1981) .... Narrator
Shocktrauma (1982, TV Movie) .... Dr. McCall
Mazes and Monsters (1982, TV Movie) .... King
Hangin' In (1982-1986, TV Series) .... Ward / Abe
Faerie Tale Theatre (1982-1987)
Strawberry Shortcake: Housewarming Surprise (1983, TV Movie) .... Mr. Sun (voice)
Rock & Rule (1983) .... Toad (voice)
Cook & Peary: The Race to the Pole (1983, TV Movie) .... Roberts
A Case of Libel (1983, TV Movie) .... Colonel Douglas
Strawberry Shortcake and the Baby Without a Name (1984, TV Movie) .... Mr. Sun / Narrator (voice)
The Bay Boy (1984) .... Chief Charlie McInnes
Star Wars: Droids (1985, TV Series) .... (voice)
Strawberry Shortcake Meets the Berrykins (1985, TV Movie) .... Mr. Sun (voice)
Jimmy Valentine (1985, TV Short) .... Victor Adams
The Edison Twins (1985-1986, TV Series) .... Lafayette / Old Trainer
Star Wars: Ewoks (1985-1986, TV Series) .... (voice)
Night Heat (1985-1986, TV Series) .... Picard / Maxim Gates
Care Bears Movie II: A New Generation (1986) .... Great Wishing Star (voice)
Barnum (1986, TV Movie) .... Olmstead
Spearfield's Daughter (1986, TV Mini-Series) .... Sylvester Spearfield
Adderly (1986, TV Series) .... Belkin
The Care Bears Family (1986-1988, TV Series) .... No Heart (voice)
The Liberators (1987, TV Series) .... Flour Merchant
Ford: The Man and the Machine (1987, TV Movie) .... Malcolmson
Mariah (1987, TV Series) .... Captain Timothy Quinlan
Dinosaucers (1987, TV Series) .... Dimetro (voice)
Friday the 13th: The Series (1987-1990, TV Series) .... Jack Marshak
ALF: The Animated Series (1987-1988, TV Series) .... (voice)
ALF Tales (1988-1989, TV Series) .... (voice)
Keroppi and Friends (1989-1994, TV Series) Narrator (voice)Babar: The Movie (1989) .... Cornelius (voice)Babar (1989-1991, TV Series) .... Cornelius (voice)Divided Loyalties (1990) .... Sir William JohnsonCounterstrike (1990-1991, TV Series) .... Kistler / Police Inspector / Sgt. LutherStreet Legal (1990-1992, TV Series) .... Ronald Spencer Sr. / Judge RitterManiac Mansion (1990, TV Series) .... Santa ClausMarried to It (1991) .... DaveSweating Bullets (1991, TV Series) .... CorlissMark Twain and Me (1991, TV Movie) .... CaptainRupert (1991, TV Series) .... (voice)Hello Kitty and Friends (1991-1995, TV Series) .... (voice)Road to Avonlea (1992, TV Series) .... Mr. McCorkadaleA Cry in the Night (1992, TV Movie) .... ClydeBy Way Of The Stars (1992-1993, TV Mini-Series) .... Captain HarrisKung Fu: The Legend Continues (1993, TV Series) .... Mike WestThe Busy World of Richard Scarry (1993-1996, TV Series) .... (voice)RoboCop: The Series (1994, TV Series) .... Dr. Roger YungTales from the Cryptkeeper (1994, TV Series) ... Slim (voice)Butterbox Babies (1995) .... Senator DanverBlack Fox (1995, TV Movie) .... Ralph HoltzBlack Fox: The Price of Peace (1995, TV Movie) .... Ralph HoltzVoices (1995) .... Angus FergussonUltraforce (1995, TV Series) .... (voice)The New Adventures of Sherlock Holmes (1995–1998, TV Series) .... Robert Cansington (voice)Sailor Moon (1995, TV Series) .... Narrator / Mr. Baxter (voice)The Neverending Story (1995, TV Series) .... Mr. Correander (voice)Little Bear (1995-2003, TV Series) .... (voice)Sins of Silence (1996, TV Movie) .... Father FlanniganPippi Longstocking (1997) .... Fridolf (voice)Fast Track (1997, TV Series) .... Carl ScannelFreaky Stories (1997, TV Series) .... Narrator ("Battleship")Windsor Protocol (1997, TV Movie) .... Sir Charles FergusonEarth: Final Conflict (1998, TV Series) .... Tim O'MalleyEvidence of Blood (1998, TV Movie) .... Horace TalbottThunder Point (1998, TV Movie) .... Charles FergusonPippi Longstocking (1998, TV Series) .... Fridolf (voice)The Defenders: Taking the First (1998, TV Movie)Birdz (1998, TV Series) .... Officer Pigeon (voice)Mythic Warriors: Guardians of the Legend (1998-1999, TV Series) .... King Proetus / Elderly Stable Hand / Great OracleBabar: King of the Elephants (1999) .... Cornelius (voice)Redwall (1999-2002, TV Series) .... Abbot Mortimer / Mangiz the Seer / Crow (voice)Franklin (2000-2004, TV Series) .... Mr. GroundhogFranklin's Magic Christmas (2001, Video) .... Mr. Collie (voice)Pecola (2001-2003, TV Series) ... (English version, voice)The Snowman Who Saved Summer (2002, Video short) .... Santa ClausThe Piano Man's Daughter (2003, TV Movie) .... James KilworthReGenesis (2005, TV Series) .... Vascily PopovOur Fathers (2005, TV Movie) .... Angelo's Old PriestFour Minutes (2006, TV Movie) .... BurnettBabar and the Adventures of Badou'' (2010-2015, TV Series) .... Cornelius (voice), (final appearance)

References

External links

1931 births
2017 deaths
20th-century English male actors
21st-century English male actors
English expatriates in Canada
English male television actors
English male voice actors
Canadian male voice actors
People from Blackpool
Canadian Screen Award winners